Events in the year 1889 in Norway.

Incumbents
Monarch – Oscar II
Prime Minister: Johan Sverdrup, then Emil Stang

Events
 The metric system was introduced in Norway (the actual law having been passed in 1875).
 The Scandinavian mile was introduced in Norway.

Arts and literature
 The local newspaper Farsunds avis was established.
 The local newspaper Lindesnes was established.

Notable births

20 January – Tryggve Gran, aviator, explorer and author (died 1980)
2 February – Hartmann Bjørnsen, gymnast and Olympic gold medallist (died 1974)
3 February – Andreas Strand, gymnast and Olympic silver medallist (died 1958)
28 February – Hermann Helgesen, gymnast and Olympic silver medallist (died 1963)
16 February – Kristian Mathias Fimland, politician
22 April – Jacob Pedersen, track and field athlete (died 1961)
27 April – Arnulf Øverland, author (died 1968)
2 May – Margit Schiøtt, politician (died 1946)
16 May – Johan Faye, sailor and Olympic silver medallist (died 1975)
20 May – Rolf Lie, gymnast and Olympic gold medallist
4 June – Thor Jensen, gymnast and Olympic bronze medallist (died 1950)
18 June – Per Krohg, artist (died 1965)
9 July – Nils Thomas, sailor and Olympic silver medallist (died 1979)
25 August – Aslaug Vaa, poet and playwright (died 1965)
2 October – Ingolf Rød, sailor and Olympic gold medallist (died 1963)
24 October  – Anders Kristian Orvin, geologist and explorer (died 1980)
5 November – Einar Staff, wholesaler (died 1972).
20 November – Nils Fixdal, athlete (died 1972)
26 November – Olaf Ørvig, sailor and Olympic gold medallist (died 1939)
2 December – Harald Færstad, gymnast and Olympic silver medallist (died 1979)
3 December – Edvin Paulsen, gymnast and Olympic bronze medallist (died 1963)

Full date unknown
Kornelius Bergsvik, politician (died 1975)
Thor Bjørklund, carpenter and inventor of the cheese slicer (died 1975)
Johan Cappelen, jurist and politician (died 1947)
Gunnar Gunnarsson Helland, Hardanger fiddle maker (died 1976)
Asbjørn Lindboe, politician and Minister (died 1967)
Henry Rudi, huntsman and polar bear hunter (died 1970)
G. Unger Vetlesen, shipbuilder and philanthropist (died 1959)

Notable deaths

10 January – Martin Andreas Udbye, composer and organist (born 1820)
25 January – 
Johan Jeremiassen, ship-owner, consul and politician (born 1843)
Johan Lauritz Sundt, industrialist (born 1828).
28 February – Gustava Kielland, author and missionary (born 1800)
10 April – Christian Collett Kjerschow, politician (born 1821)
24 June – August Thomle, jurist and politician (born 1816)
29 June – Gustav Christian Gjøs, politician (born 1810)
16 September – Iver Steen Thomle, jurist (born 1812)
19 October – Jacob Kielland, naval officer and politician (born 1825)
23 December – Johan Jørgen Lange Hanssen, politician (born 1821)
Job Dischington Bødtker, jurist and politician (born 1818)
Ole Jacob Broch, politician and Minister (born 1818)
Halvor Olsen Folkestad, councillor of state (born 1807)
Ketil Motzfeldt, politician and Minister (born 1814)

References